Head over Heels is a 1922 American comedy film starring Mabel Normand and directed by Paul Bern and Victor Schertzinger. This is a surviving comedy film at the Library of Congress. The supporting cast includes Raymond Hatton and Adolphe Menjou.

Plot
As described in a film magazine, Tina (Normand), an Italian acrobat, is engaged by Sterling (Menjou), a member of a New York City theater company, to come to New York City as a star. She arrives in her native costume and, realizing he has picked a lemon, Sterling asks Lawson (Thompson), his partner, to get him out of the contract. A press agent learns of the situation and agrees to take over the contract. He arranges to have her meet Al Wilkins (Belmore), a patent medicine manufacturer, who is also a motion picture magnet. After being dressed up by a beauty specialist, both Wilkins and Lawson crave her favor. She is in love with Lawson, however, and when he receives a business note from another, she almost breaks up his party by jumping into its midst and fighting Lawson's client. In the end everything is straightened out and there is a "twinkling of wedding bells" finish.

Cast
Mabel Normand as Tina
Hugh Thompson as Lawson
Russ Powell as Papa Bambinetti
Raymond Hatton as Pepper
Adolphe Menjou as Sterling
Lilyan Tashman as Edith Penfield
Lionel Belmore as Al Wilkins

References

External links

 
 
Film still at Looking for Mabel Normand website
Press kit at Looking for Mabel Normand website

Silent American comedy films
1922 films
1922 comedy films
American silent feature films
American black-and-white films
1920s English-language films
Goldwyn Pictures films
Films directed by Victor Schertzinger
Films with screenplays by Gerald Duffy
Films based on works by Nalbro Bartley
1920s American films